The Mahendra Museum is a museum located in Nepal. The museum is situated inside Hanuman Dhoka palace Museum in Kathmandu Durbar square. The museum is named in honor of His Majesty Mahendra Bir Bikram Shah Dev.

References

See also 
 List of museums in Nepal

Museums in Kathmandu
Kathmandu Durbar Square